Farkhod Saidzhonovich Vasiyev (born 14 April 1990) is a Tajikistani footballer who plays as a left back for the Tajikistan national football team.

Career

Club
In January 2010, Vasiyev went on trial with Krylia Sovetov.

On 2 March 2017, FC Istiklol announced that they had signed Vasiyev on loan from FC Orenburg, until the summer of 2017.

International
After being sent-off in Tajikistan's 2–2 draw against Kyrgyzstan in the 2018 FIFA World Cup qualifiers on 8 October 2015, Vasiyev was subsequently banned for four matches, meaning he would miss Tajikistan's remaining qualifiers.

Personal life
His brother, Dilshod is also a professional footballer.

Career statistics

Club

International

Statistics accurate as of match played 19 November 2019

International goals
Scores and results list Tajikistan's goal tally first.

References

External links
Profile at Saturn 

1990 births
Living people
Tajikistani footballers
Tajikistani expatriate footballers
Association football defenders
FC Saturn Ramenskoye players
Tajikistan international footballers
Expatriate footballers in Russia
Tajikistani expatriate sportspeople in Russia
Russian Premier League players
PFC Krylia Sovetov Samara players
Sportspeople from Dushanbe
FC Zhemchuzhina Sochi players
FC Shinnik Yaroslavl players
FC Volgar Astrakhan players
FC Orenburg players
FC Tyumen players
FC Neftekhimik Nizhnekamsk players
FC Tambov players
Tajikistan youth international footballers